Hidenwood is a neighborhood in the independent city of Newport News, Virginia which is located off Warwick Boulevard just west of the campus of Christopher Newport University (CNU). 

Hidenwood was developed in the 1950s in an area of Warwick County originally known as Nutmeg Quarter in the Colony of Virginia. It was named to honor Philip Wallace Hiden, a local businessman and civic leader.

See also
Newport News, Virginia

References

Hidenwood